Enrichetta Caracciolo (February 17, 1821 – March 17, 1901) was an Italian writer. She is best known for her 1864 autobiographical work Misteri del chiostro napoletano (Secrets of a Neapolitan cloister).

The daughter of Gennaro Caracciolo, prince of Forino, and Teresa Cutelli, she was born in Naples. When she was still young, the family moved frequently due to the nature of her father's job in government service. After his death, financial difficulties forced her mother to send Caracciolo to a Benedictine convent in 1840. She was not able to regain her freedom until 1860.

Caracciolo was made inspector for Naples' seminaries for girls by Giuseppe Garibaldi. She married Giovanni Greuther, who died in 1885. The first edition of Misteri del chiostro napoletano was reprinted six times; it also appeared in English and French translations. She also published two plays Un delitto impunito: fatto storico del 1838 (1866) and Un episodio dei misteri del Chiostro Napolitano (1883).

Caracciolo worked as a journalist and lobbied for women's rights until her death in Naples at the age of 80.

References 

1821 births
1901 deaths
Italian autobiographers
Italian journalists
19th-century Italian women writers